Amboise is a commune in the Indre-et-Loire department in central France. Today a small market town, it was once home of the French royal court.

Geography
Amboise station, on the north bank of the Loire, has rail connections to Orléans, Blois and Tours.

History

Clovis I ( 466 – 511) and the Visigoths signed a peace treaty of alliance with the Arvernians in 503, which assisted him in his defeat of the Visigothic kingdom in the Battle of Vouillé in 507.

Joan of Arc passed through in 1429 on her way to Orleans to the Battle of Patay.

Château du Clos Lucé was the residence of Leonardo da Vinci between 1516 and his death in 1519. Da Vinci died in the arms of King Francis I, and he was buried in a crypt near the Château d'Amboise. The house has lost some of its original parts, but it still stands today containing a museum of da Vinci's work and inventions, and overlooks the river Loire.

The Amboise conspiracy was the conspiracy of Condé and the Huguenots in 1560 against Francis II, Catherine de' Medici and the Guises.

The Château at Amboise was home to Mary Stewart, Queen of Scots, for much of her early life, being raised there at the French court of Henry II. She arrived in France from Scotland in 1548, aged six, via the French king's favourite palace at Saint-Germain-en-Laye near Paris, and remained in France until 1561, when she returned to her homeland—sailing up the Firth of Forth to Edinburgh on 15 August that year.

The Edict of Amboise (1563) conceded the free exercise of worship to the Protestants.

 
 
Here was born in 1743 Louis Claude de Saint-Martin, French philosopher, known as Le Philosophe Inconnu (d. 1803).

Abd el Kader Ibn Mouhi Ad-Din (c. 1807 – 1883) was imprisoned at the Château d'Amboise.

In 2019, the 500th anniversary of da Vinci's death, Amboise held many events celebrating the master's life and his work completed in the town. The number of visitors to Château du Clos Lucé, for example, was estimated as 500,000 in 2019, a 30% increase over the typical annual number.

Population

Sights
The narrow streets contain some good examples of timbered housing.

Just outside the city is the Pagode de Chanteloup, a  Chinese pagoda built in 1775 by the Duke of Choiseul. The pagoda is seven levels high, with each level slightly smaller than the last one. An interior staircase to reach all levels is open to the public.

The Musée de la Poste (in the Hôtel Joyeuse) is a museum tracing the history of the postal delivery service.

A 20th-century fountain by Max Ernst stands in front of the market place.

Economy 
Amboise has a thriving tourism-related business community. Until 2021, it had also the headquarters of Mecachrome, a precision engineering company that operates in the aerospace, motor racing, energy and defence sectors.

International relations

Amboise is twinned with:
  Boppard, Germany
  Fana, Mali
  Suwa (prefecture of Nagano), Japan
  Vinci, Italy
  Băleni (province of Galați), Romania

Gallery

See also 
 Communes of the Indre-et-Loire department
 Colin Biart, 15th/16th-century French architect
 Lestra

References

External links

 Architecture of Amboise
 Monument Historique de la Loire : La Pagode Chanteloup
 Château Gaillard, Amboise

Communes of Indre-et-Loire
Touraine